Gypsy Punks: Underdog World Strike is the third album by Gogol Bordello, released in 2005 by SideOneDummy Records.

Other songs from the same era and recording sessions appear on the EP East Infection.

Track listing

Personnel
Gogol Bordello
Eugene Hütz – vocals, guitar, fire buckets, body percussion
Sergey Ryabtsev – violin, vocals
Yuri Lemeshev – accordion, vocals
Oren Kaplan – guitar, vocals
Rea Mochiach – bass, percussion, electronics, programming, vocals
Eliot Ferguson – drums, vocals
Pamela Jintana Racine – percussion, vocals
Elizabeth Sun – percussion, vocals

Guests
Pedro Erazo – vocals
Ras Kush – MC

References 

2005 albums
Gogol Bordello albums
Albums produced by Steve Albini